United States gubernatorial elections were held on November 8, 1988, in 12 states and two territories. Going into the elections, eight seats were held by Republicans, and four by Democrats. After the elections, the Democrats had a net gain of one seat. The elections coincided with the United States House elections, United States Senate elections and presidential election.

Election results

See also
1988 United States elections
1988 United States presidential election
1988 United States Senate elections
1988 United States House of Representatives elections

Notes

References

 
November 1988 events in the United States